The Israel Antiquities Authority (IAA,  ; , before 1990, the Israel Department of Antiquities) is an independent Israeli governmental authority responsible for enforcing the 1978 Law of Antiquities. The IAA regulates excavation and conservation, and promotes research. The Director-General is Mr. Eli Escusido, and its offices are housed in the Rockefeller Museum.

The Israel Antiquities Authority plans to move into a new building for the National Campus for the Archaeology of Israel in Jerusalem, next to the Israel Museum.

History
The Israel Department of Antiquities and Museums (IDAM) of the Ministry of Education was founded on July 26, 1948, after the establishment of the State of Israel. It took over the functions of the Department of Antiquities of the British Mandate in Israel and Palestine. Originally, its activities were based on the British Mandate Department of Antiquities ordinances.

IDAM was the statutory authority responsible for Israel's antiquities and for the administration of small museums. Its functions include curation of the state collection of antiquities, storing of the state collection, maintaining a list of registered antiquities sites, inspecting antiquities sites and registering newly discovered sites, conducting salvage and rescue operations of endangered antiquities sites, maintaining an archaeological library (the state library), maintaining an archive.

The Israel Antiquities Authority (IAA) was created from the IDAM by the Knesset (Israeli parliament)  in a 1990 statute. Amir Drori became its first director. The period of expansion lasted for a number of years, but was followed by a period in which diminished fiscal resources and a reduction in funding led to large cutbacks in the size of its work force and its activities.

Publications
It published the results of excavations in three journals:
Booklet of the Department of Antiquities (Hebrew), now defunct
IAA Reports monograph series, started in the late 1990s (English)
Atiqot (Hebrew and English), still published
Hadashot Arkheologiyot – Excavations and Surveys in Israel (HA-ESI; Hebrew and English), still published, online.
Qadmoniot: A Journal for the Antiquities of Eretz-Israel and Bible (Hebrew), published by Israel Exploration Society together with the IAA.
 Archaeological Survey of Israel. A GIS database of tiled maps covering  of the State of Israel. Descriptive texts and media of surveyed sites. A continuous project, published online only (previously in print).

The National Campus for the Archaeology of Israel

The Jay and Jeanie Schottenstein National Campus for the Archaeology of Israel is the future building of the IAA, aiming to concentrate all centralized administrative offices into one structure. The campus is planned on 20,000 square meters between the Israel Museum and the Bible Lands Museum in Jerusalem by Architect Moshe Safdie.

Organizational structure
The IAA's organization consists of:
Management  
Deputy Director for Archaeology  
IAA Regional Offices (Northern Region, Central Region, Jerusalem Region, Southern Region and maritime archaeology Unit)
Excavations and Surveys Department  
Artifacts Treatment Department  
Conservation Department  
National Treasures Department  
Information Technology Department  
Publications Department  
Antiquities Robbery Prevention Unit  
Archives Department  
library  
IAA Internet Sites Unit  
Finance Administration  
Planning, Coordination and Control Administration  
Administrative and Security Services Branch  
Staff Officer for Archaeology – Civil Administration of Judea and Samaria

Directors

Shmuel Yeivin, 1948–1961
Avraham Biran, 1961–1974
Avraham Eitan, 1974–1988
Amir Drori, 1988–2000
Yehoshua (Shuka) Dorfman, 2000–July 31, 2014
Yisrael Hasson, 2014–2020
Eli Escusido he  2021-

Other staff
Levi Rahmani, archeologist and Chief Curator during the 1980s

Restoration work 
The IAA's six-member restoration team restores potsherds, textiles, metal objects and other objects related to the material culture of the country discovered in archaeological excavations. Unlike their peers around the world, the team in Israel is barred by Israeli law from working with human remains.

See also
Council for Conservation of Heritage Sites in Israel, preserves sites from 1700 onwards not covered by the Antiquities Law

References

External links 

 
 Eisenbrauns - Official distributor for IAA publications in North America
 The Jay and Jeanie Schottenstein National Campus for the Archaeology of Israel on the Israel Antiquities Authority website.

 
National archaeological organizations
Archaeology of Israel
Antiquities Authority
Organizations based in Jerusalem
Government agencies established in 1948
1948 establishments in Israel